The 1916–17 Colgate men's ice hockey season was the 2nd season of play for the program.

Season
Colgate increased their season schedule to three games and played one of the upper echelon teams, losing 3–7 to Yale.

Due to World War I, Colgate did not field a team the following year and would not restart their program until 1920.

Note: Colgate's athletic teams did not have a moniker until 'Red Raiders' was adopted in 1932.

Roster

Standings

Schedule and Results

|-
!colspan=12 style=";" | Regular Season

References

Colgate Raiders men's ice hockey seasons
Colgate
Colgate
Colgate
Colgate